McKernan is an Irish surname originating in Cavan.

People
Notable people with the surname include:
Corey McKernan (born 1973), Australian rules footballer
Hugh McKernan (1858–1929), Australian politician
Jackie McKernan (born 1965), British athlete from Northern Ireland
James McKernan (born 1964), British mathematician
John R. McKernan Jr. (born 1948), American politician, Governor of Maine
Ken McKernan (1911–2009), Australian rules footballer
Kevin McKernan (born 1987), Irish Gaelic footballer
Noel McKernan (born 1945), Australian rules footballer
P. Patrick McKernan (1941–2001), American baseball administrator
Ron "Pigpen" McKernan (1945–1973), American musician
Shaun McKernan (born 1990), Australian rules footballer
Timothy McKernan (born 1989), American ice dancer

Places
 McKernan, Edmonton, Canada
 McKernan/Belgravia station, Edmonton, Canada

See also
 McKiernan Clan
 McKiernan (surname)
 McKernon (disambiguation)
 McTiernan
 McTernan
 Kiernan
 Kernan (disambiguation)
 Tiernan

References